Chester Bourne (born 1889, date of death unknown) was a cricketer from British Guiana. He played in one first-class match for British Guiana in 1922/23.

See also
 List of Guyanese representative cricketers

References

External links
 

1889 births
Year of death missing
Cricketers from British Guiana
People from Saint Michael, Barbados